Peter Bangs Vej station is a station on the Frederikssund radial of the S-train network in Copenhagen, Denmark. The station, located where the railway tracks cross Peter Bangs Vej, was designed by the Danish State Railways architect K.T. Seest and opened on 23 September 1941. The station was made famous in 2001, shortly after the 9/11 terrorist attacks in New York, for being the location from where an emergency 112 call was made and in which Danish Police failed to respond.

See also
List of railway stations in Denmark

References

External links

S-train (Copenhagen) stations
Knud Tanggaard Seest railway stations
Railway stations opened in 1941
Railway stations in Denmark opened in the 20th century